Squire and Partners is a British architectural firm founded in 1976 known for designing and executing buildings on key sites in London and internationally.

Projects
Key projects cover a range of sectors, varying from small bespoke fitouts to large-scale urban masterplans:

Office projects include headquarters for the British fashion brand Reiss and Britain's largest public trade union UNISON HQ, prominent Central London developments at 5 Hanover Square, and 11 Baker Street, and bespoke interiors at the Stratton Street offices in Mayfair, London.

Masterplans include sites at One Tower Bridge, Chelsea Barracks, West India Quay, and most recently the 
Shell Centre on the Southbank.

Hotel projects include the five star Bulgari Hotel & Residences in London with Antonio Citterio Patricia Viel and Partners, the boutique Rockwell Hotel, and the Hilton Liverpool.

Squire and Partners has designed many of London's "prime presidential" developments including Chelsea Barracks, One Tower Bridge, Clarges Mayfair, Ebury Square, Netherhall Gardens and The Knightsbridge Apartments.

Other projects include an education centre for the British Council in Nairobi where the Visual Arts Department commissioned a site specific work for the new building from artist David Tremlett and Howick Place, an arts based hub of apartments and studios for designer tenants including Tom Ford, Marc Newson and a gallery for Phillips de Pury.

Project developments 
Squire and Partners also have their own property and business portfolio, including Urban Golf, which operates three indoor golf venues with golf simulators in Central London, a bar and restaurant at 06 St. Chads Place, mixed-use developments at Northdown Street and Clapham Park Road, The Rockwell Hotel, a house and apartment development on Liverpool Road, and the practice's own offices at 77 Wicklow Street.

See also
22 Marsh Wall (aka The Landmark), Canary Wharf, London

References

External links 
 Squire and Partners

Architecture firms of England
1976 establishments in the United Kingdom